The Women's National Champions are the National Champions for squash in the United States.  These winners are the officially recognized champions by US Squash, the national governing body. From 1907 until 1994, the national championship was contested through hardball squash. When the national governing body began recognizing international softball as the official game in the United States, the national championship also switched to softball.  The first softball Women's National Championship was conducted in 1994 and was won by Demer Holleran. The softball Women's National Championship, unlike the previous hardball championship, is limited to U.S. citizens only. The National Hardball Championship would continue past this date, but was no longer recognized as the official Women's National Championship.

Women's National Champions

Records

Most Overall Titles

Most University Alumni Titles

See also
US Junior Open squash championship
U.S. Squash
Men's National Champions (Squash)

References

Squash in the United States
Squash tournaments in the United States